Dimenoxadol (INN) (brand name Estocin (in Russia)), or dimenoxadole (BAN), is an opioid analgesic which is a benzilic acid derivative, closely related to benactyzine (an anticholinergic). Further, the structure is similar to methadone and related compounds like dextropropoxyphene.

It was invented in Germany in the 1950s, and produces similar effects to other opioids, including analgesia, sedation, dizziness and nausea.

In the United States it is a Schedule I Narcotic controlled substance with an ACSCN of 9617 and a 2013 annual aggregate manufacturing quota of zero.

References 

Analgesics
Synthetic opioids
Ethers
Carboxylate esters
Mu-opioid receptor agonists